Chortophaga viridifasciata, the green-striped grasshopper, is a species of band-winged grasshopper in the family Acrididae. It is found in Central America and North America, ranging from British Columbia to the Gulf of Mexico (mostly east of the Rocky Mountains), south to Costa Rica.

Green-striped grasshoppers inhabit relatively moist areas of short grass, such as roadsides and hay meadows. Their size ranges from 23 to 30 mm for males and 28 to 38 mm for females.

The subspecies Chortophaga viridifasciata australior is sometimes listed as a separate species, but it intergrades northward with subspecies viridifasciata, making species level distinction unlikely.

Subspecies
These two subspecies belong to the species Chortophaga viridifasciata:
 Chortophaga viridifasciata australior b (southern green-striped grasshopper)
 Chortophaga viridifasciata viridifasciata b (northern green-striped grasshopper)
Data sources: i = ITIS, c = Catalogue of Life, g = GBIF, b = Bugguide.net

References

Further reading

External links

 

Oedipodinae
Insects described in 1773
Taxa named by Charles De Geer